Blood Alliance is the fifth studio album of the British power metal band Power Quest, with recording between September/October 2010 at Foel Studios, Wales with producer Chris Fielding and released worldwide by April 2011.

The album followed significant lineup changes in the band of whom the only original member is keyboardist, songwriter and founder Steve Williams. In May 2010, it was announced that the new vocalist and guitarist were Chitral "Chity" Somapala and Gavin Owen. The album was the first album to include the new lineup with Chitral "Chity" Somapala, Gavin Owen, Andy Midgley, Paul Finnie and Rich Smith. In November 2010, mixing for the album scheduled to occur at a studio in Vicenza, Italy was disrupted by floods to the area which damaged the studio, delaying production.

Colombian artist Felipe Machado Franco provided artwork for the album.

On January 10, 2011 worldwide release dates were announced, with 26 January 2011 for Japan and South East Asia, 28 March 2011 for most of Europe, 23 March 2011 for Spain, Finland and Sweden, 25 March 2011 for Germany, Austria, Switzerland and Italy, and April 5, 2011 for the United States and Canada.

Track listing

Japanese bonus track

Personnel
 Chitral "Chity" Somapala - Vocals
 Steve Williams - Keyboards, backing vocals
 Andy Midgley - Guitars, backing vocals
 Gavin Owen - Guitars
 Paul Finnie - Bass guitar
 Rich Smith - Drums

Sources

2011 albums
Power Quest albums
Napalm Records albums